Calvey Township is an unincorporated township in Franklin County, in the U.S. state of Missouri.

Calvey Township was established in 1821, and named after Calvey Creek.

References

Townships in Missouri
Townships in Franklin County, Missouri